New Plymouth District Council is the territorial authority for the New Plymouth District of New Zealand.

The council consists of the mayor of New Plymouth, and 14 ward councillors.

Composition

Councillors

 Mayor: 
 New Plymouth Ward: 10 councillors
 North Ward: two councillors
 South-West Ward: two councillors

Community board

 Clifton Community Board: four members
 Inglewood Community Board: four members
 Kaitake Community Board: four members
 Waitara Community Board: four members

History

New Plymouth Province was established in 1853, renamed Taranaki Province in 1859, and disestablished in 1876.

The current council was established in 1989, by merging New Plymouth City Council with Clifton County Council (established in 1885), Inglewood County Council (established in 1902), and Waitara County Council (established in 1904).

One of New Plymouth District Council’s goals is to preserve the local cultural heritage items, such as buildings, structures and areas, archaeological and waahi tapu sites.

References

External links
 Official website

New Plymouth District
Politics of Taranaki
Territorial authorities of New Zealand